Moskovsky (masculine), Moskovskaya (feminine), or Moskovskoye (neuter) may refer to:
Moskovsky District, name of several districts in the countries of the former Soviet Union
Moscow Okrug (Moskovsky okrug), name of various divisions in Russia
Moskovsky Settlement, an administrative and municipal division of the federal city of Moscow, Russia
Moskovsky (inhabited locality) (Moskovskaya, Moskovskoye), several inhabited localities in Russia
Moskovsky Rail Terminal (disambiguation), name of several rail terminals in Russia
Moskovsky Avenue, a major avenue in St. Petersburg, Russia
Moskovskiy, a location in Khatlon Province, Tajikistan
Moscow Oblast (Moskovskaya oblast), a federal subject of Russia
Moskovskaya metro station (disambiguation), several metro stations in Russia
Moskovskaya (brand), a brand of Russian vodkas

See also
Moscow (disambiguation)
Moskau (disambiguation)
Moskva (disambiguation)
Moszkowski